Fethi is the Turkish spelling of the Arabic name Fathi (Arabic: فَتْحِي fat·ḥiy/ fat·ḥī/ fat·ḥy) which means "victorious, triumphant". 

It may refer to:

 Fethi Benslama (born 1961), Paris-based Tunisian psychoanalyst
 Fethi Heper (born 1944), retired Turkish footballer
 Ali Fethi Okyar (1880–1943), Turkish diplomat
 Fethi Sekin (1973–2017), Turkish police office killed on duty

See also
 Fathi

Turkish masculine given names